Pomaderris coomingalensis is a species of flowering plant in the family Rhamnaceae and is endemic to Queensland. It is a shrub with hairy young stems, egg-shaped or elliptic leaves, and clusters of cream-coloured or yellow flowers.

Description
Flowering occurs in November and December.

Taxonomy
Pomaderris coomingalensis was first formally described in 1997 by Neville Grant Walsh and Fiona Coates and the description was published in the journal Muelleria from specimens collected by Paul Irwin Forster in the Coominglah Range in 1994.

Distribution and habitat
This pomaderris grows in open forest and is only known from the type location.

Conservation status
This pomaderris is listed as "endangered" under the Queensland Government Nature Conservation Act 1992.

References

coomingalensis
Flora of Queensland
Plants described in 1997